The 1964 United States presidential election in Nevada took place on November 3, 1964, as part of the 1964 United States presidential election. State voters chose three representatives, or electors, to the Electoral College, who voted for president and vice president.

Nevada was won by incumbent President Lyndon B. Johnson (D–Texas), with 58.58% of the popular vote, against Senator Barry Goldwater (R–Arizona), with 41.42% of the popular vote.

As of the 2020 presidential election, this is the last election in which Elko County, Humboldt County, Pershing County, Lander County, Lincoln County, and Eureka County voted for a Democratic Presidential candidate. Washoe County and Carson City did not vote Democratic again until 2008.

Results

Results by county

See also
United States presidential elections in Nevada

References

Nevada
1964
1964 Nevada elections